Oxford Blues is a 1984 British comedy-drama sports film written and directed by Robert Boris and starring Rob Lowe, Ally Sheedy and Amanda Pays. It is a remake of the 1938 Metro-Goldwyn-Mayer film A Yank at Oxford and was Lowe's first starring role in a feature.

Plot
Nick Di Angelo is working in a Las Vegas casino to earn enough money to pursue the woman of his dreams, Lady Victoria Wingate, to Oxford, England. He believes the only way to win her is to get into Oxford University and join the rowing team. After spending the night with a beautiful older woman, he collects enough money to make the trip and arrives at Oxford in his 1955 Ford Thunderbird, which promptly gets stuck between two walls along a very narrow street. Thus begins Di Angelo's troubles in Britain.

Di Angelo is accepted into Oriel College; consequently, large parts of the film are set in the college itself.

The coxswain of the rowing team that Di Angelo joins, Rona, is also an American. Di Angelo quickly finds Lady Victoria but also finds that she is deeply involved with another Oxford rower, Colin Gilchrist Fisher, a member of Christ Church college.

Eventually, Di Angelo comes to learn not only the value of friendship and love, but also the importance of keeping promises to teammates and to oneself as well as the importance of thinking beyond oneself.

Cast
 Rob Lowe as Nick Di Angelo
 Amanda Pays as Lady Victoria Wingate
 Julian Sands as Colin Gilchrist Fisher
 Ally Sheedy as Rona
 Julian Firth as Geordie Nevitts
 Alan Howard as Simon Rutledge
 Gail Strickland as Las Vegas Lady
 Michael Gough as Dr. Ambrose
 Aubrey Morris as Dr. Quentin Boggs
 Anthony Calf as Gareth Rycroft
 Cary Elwes as Lionel
 Bruce Payne as Peter Howles
 Richard Hunt as Larry
 Charles Grant as Student Photographer
 Chad Lowe as Computer Hacker (uncredited)
 Pip Torrens as Ian

Production
The film was financed independently by Elliot Kastner. Kastner told Robert Boris he had between $2–3 million available to make a film in England and wanted to know if Boris had any projects which might be suitable. Boris pitched him the movie and Kastner paid him to develop a script. Kastner liked the script and financed the film, although he did not give Boris the funds the director requested to shoot additional films.

Lowe suggested Princess Stephanie of Monaco for the role of Lady Victoria as he had a crush on her. Enquiries were made but no response was received.

The film was almost entirely shot on location in Oxford.

MGM paid $6 million for the rights to distribute the movie even though the film only cost $1.8 million. Kastner was also entitled to a $1 million fee at the discretion of Frank Yablans then head of MGM. Peter Bart, an executive at MGM at the time, called the deal unprecedented.

Reception
The film received poor reviews.

It opened eighth at the box office grossing $2.4 million in its first weekend. This was considered a major disappointment.

"For some reason my movies do real well in Canada," said Lowe shortly after the film came out. "Oxford Blues is doing well here. It's making no money in the southern United States. In the suburbs I do well, in the cities not so well. " A colleague of his said at the same time "Rob was very hurt about the critical reaction to Oxford Blues, because he really thought it would work. But he's tough and realistic. He knows it was a failure, and he knows it wasn't his fault. That last scene, where he strips and changes clothes like a paper doll – he fought against doing that, let me tell you."

References

Notes

External links

1980s sports comedy-drama films
1980s teen comedy-drama films
Remakes of British films
British sports comedy-drama films
British teen comedy-drama films
Films directed by Robert Boris
Films set in Oxford
Films set in the Las Vegas Valley
Films set in universities and colleges
Films shot in Oxfordshire
Films shot in the Las Vegas Valley
Metro-Goldwyn-Mayer films
Rowing at the University of Oxford
Rowing films
Teen sports films
University of Oxford in fiction
1984 directorial debut films
Films scored by John Du Prez
Films produced by Elliott Kastner
1980s English-language films
1980s British films